Ivan Schitco(SKITSKO) (born 4 January 2003) is a Moldovan chess player who holds the title of Grandmaster (GM, 2022).

Biography 
Ivan Schitco is one of the best young Moldovan chess players. He participated in European Youth Chess Championships and World Youth Chess Championships.He trained with the international master Boris Itkis and regularly attended the sessions of the Chess Federation Performance Center under the guidance of the distinguished coach Grandmaster Dmitrii Svetuskin.
He got the bronze in 2012 at the World School Chess Championship.
In November 2017, he ranked first at the Botvinnic Cup International Tournament in Moscow (Russia), where the strongest juniors from 11 countries participated, including 8 chess players with international titles. In 2019 Ivan Schitco won European School Chess Championship in U17 age group.

Ivan Schitco played for Moldova in the Chess Olympiad:
 In 2022, at first board in the 44th Chess Olympiad in Chennai (+2, =7, -1). He leading Moldova to a historical 6th place at the 44th Chess Olympiad and drawing World Chess Championship Magnus Carlsen in the same tournament.

Ivan Schitco played for Moldova in the European Team Chess Championship:
 In 2019, at third board in the 22nd European Team Chess Championship in Batumi (+3, =1, -3).

In 2019, he was awarded the FIDE International Master (IM) title and received the FIDE Grandmaster (GM) title three years later.

Ivan Schitco is currently a student and chess team member at University of Texas at Dallas.

References

External links 

2003 births
Living people
Chess players from Chișinău
Chess grandmasters
Moldovan chess players